Eric Hardmeyer (born 1959) is the former president and CEO of the Bank of North Dakota.

Hardmeyer is a Mott, North Dakota, native, and a graduate of the University of North Dakota, and the University of Mary. He joined the Bank of North Dakota in 1985 as a loan officer. In 2001, he was named president and CEO. In April 2021, he announced his retirement from his position.

References

 Interview with Eric Hardmeyer. Federal Reserve Bank, Ninth District. Accessed 2011-02-02.
 HARDMEYER NAMED BANK OF NORTH DAKOTA PRESIDENT. Government of North Dakota. Accessed 2011-02-02.

People from Hettinger County, North Dakota
University of North Dakota alumni
1959 births
Living people
University of Mary alumni
American bankers